Air Chief Marshal Sir Ruthven Lowry "Gerry" Wade,  (15 July 1920 – 24 September 2001) was a senior Royal Air Force officer who served as Vice-Chief of the Air Staff from 1973 to 1976.

RAF career
Educated at Cheltenham College, Wade joined the Royal Air Force in 1938 and served in the Second World War. After the War he became Officer Commanding No. 39 Squadron and then Station Commander at RAF Gaydon. He was appointed Director of Operations – Bomber and Reconnaissance in 1966, Air Executive to Deputy for Nuclear Affairs at SHAPE in 1967 and Air Officer Commanding No. 1 Group in 1968. He went on to be Deputy Commander-in-Chief at RAF Germany in 1971, Assistant Chief of the Air Staff (Operations) in January 1973 and Vice-Chief of the Air Staff in November 1973. His last appointment was as Chief of Personnel and Logistics in 1976 before he retired in 1978.

Family
In 1945 he married Denise Davis; they had a son.

References

|-

1920 births
2001 deaths
People educated at Cheltenham College
Royal Air Force air marshals
Knights Commander of the Order of the Bath
Recipients of the Distinguished Flying Cross (United Kingdom)